Vanderlip is an unincorporated community in Hampshire County in the U.S. state of West Virginia. Vanderlip is located west of Romney along the Northwestern Turnpike (U.S. Route 50) and the South Branch Valley Railroad. At times the community was referred to as West Romney Station, while its post office used the name Vanderlip, after a Baltimore and Ohio Railroad executive. The "heart" of Vanderlip is centered between Vanderlip Drive and Ozark Hill Road.

The community was named after Frank A. Vanderlip, a railroad banker.

References 

Unincorporated communities in Hampshire County, West Virginia
Populated places on the South Branch Potomac River
Unincorporated communities in West Virginia
Northwestern Turnpike
South Branch Valley Railroad